Ti me više ne voliš (You Don't Love Me Anymore) is the debut studio album by Bosnian pop singer Donna Ares. It was released in 1998 through Sani Records.

All of the songs were written by Ares and produced by her husband Džavid Ljubovci.

Track listing

References

1998 debut albums
Donna Ares albums